Pavel Nikolayevich Kireyenko (born 14 June 1994) is a Russian football player who plays for Kazakhstani club Tobol.

Club career
He made his professional debut in the Russian Professional Football League for FC Zenit-2 St. Petersburg on 15 July 2013 in a game against FC Tosno. He made his Russian Football National League debut for Zenit-2 on 12 July 2015 in a game against FC Torpedo Armavir.

On 28 January 2022, Kireyenko left Noah by mutual consent.

References

1994 births
Footballers from Saint Petersburg
Living people
Russian footballers
Association football forwards
FC Tosno players
FC Zenit-2 Saint Petersburg players
FC Dynamo Saint Petersburg players
FC Sibir Novosibirsk players
FC Tom Tomsk players
FC Noah players
FC Caspiy players
Russian First League players
Russian Second League players
Armenian Premier League players
Kazakhstan Premier League players
Russian expatriate footballers
Expatriate footballers in Lithuania
Russian expatriate sportspeople in Lithuania
Expatriate footballers in Armenia
Russian expatriate sportspeople in Armenia
Expatriate footballers in Kazakhstan
Russian expatriate sportspeople in Kazakhstan